Barbados competed at the 1984 Summer Olympics in Los Angeles, United States.  The nation returned to the Olympic Games after participating in the American-led boycott of the 1980 Summer Olympics. Sixteen competitors, thirteen men and three women, took part in sixteen events in six sports.

Athletics

Men's 400 metres 
Elvis Forde  
 Heat — 45.47
 Quarterfinals — 45.60
 Semifinals — 45.32 (→ did not advance)
David Peltier  
 Heat — 46.57
 Quarterfinals — 46.48 (→ did not advance)
 Richard Louis
 Heat — 46.70 (→ did not advance)

Women's 400m Hurdles 
 Cheryl Blackman
 Heat — 1:01.19 (→ did not advance)
 Carlon Blackman
 Clyde Edwards
 Hamil Grimes
 Anthony Jones
 John Mayers

Boxing

Edward Neblett
Ed Pollard

Cycling

One cyclist represented Barbados in 1984.

Sprint
 Charles Pile

1000m time trial
 Charles Pile

Sailing

Bruce Bayley
Howard Palmer

Swimming

Men's 200m Butterfly
Harry Wozniak
 Heat — 2:13.17 (→ did not advance, 31st place)

Men's 200m Individual Medley
Harry Wozniak
 Heat — 2:22.49 (→ did not advance, 37th place)

Men's 400m Individual Medley
Harry Wozniak
 Heat — 4:53.87 (→ did not advance, 18th place)

Synchronized swimming

Chemene Sinson

References

External links
Official Olympic Reports

Nations at the 1984 Summer Olympics
1984
Olympics